Lars Berg (4 June 1916 – 24 June 1988) was a Swedish sports shooter. He competed in the 50 m pistol event at the 1948 Summer Olympics.

References

1916 births
1988 deaths
Swedish male sport shooters
Olympic shooters of Sweden
Shooters at the 1948 Summer Olympics
Sportspeople from Gothenburg